The 1925 Virginia Cavaliers football team was an American football team that represented the University of Virginia as a member of the Southern Conference during the 1925 season. In its third season under head coach Greasy Neale, Virginia compiled a 7–1–1 record (4–1–1 against conference opponents) and outscored opponents by a total of 144 to 31. The team played its home games at Lambeth Field in Charlottesville, Virginia.

Schedule

References

Virginia
Virginia Cavaliers football seasons
Virginia Cavaliers football